There are a few different places in Japan named either Nogata　(野方) or Nōgata　(直方). They include the following:

Nōgata, Fukuoka, a city in Fukuoka Prefecture
Nogata, Tokyo, a district in Nakano, Tokyo
Nogata, Kita-ku, Nagoya, a district in Kita-ku, Nagoya
Nogata, Nakamura-ku, Nagoya, a district in Nakamura-ku, Nagoya
Nogata, Ichinomiya, an area in Oku-chō, Ichinomiya, Aichi
Nogata, Aisai, an area in Yamaji-chō, Aisai, Aichi
Nogata, Yatomi, an area in Maegasu-chō, Yatomi, Aichi
Nogata, Tōhaku, an area in Yurihama-chō, Tōhaku District
Nogata, Soo, an area in Ōsaki-chō, Soo District